Annona purpurea is an edible fruit and medicinal plant in the Annonaceae family. It is native to Mexico, Central America, and parts of South America. Its common names include soncoya, sincuya, and cabeza de negro.

Description
It is deciduous with hairy leaves and large, strong-scented flowers. Its pollen is shed as permanent tetrads.  

The fruit is rounded, 15 to 20 centimeters wide, and covered with a felt-textured brown skin that is hard to cut open when ripe. The surface of the fruit has hooklike projections. It has many seeds which have a germination time of 1 to 6 months. Trees take about 1 to 3 years to bear and can be container grown. This species is closely related to the cherimoya, the sugar-apple and other Annonas. The soncoya is fairly obscure among Annonas; the fruit is of indifferent quality and has not attracted wide cultivation. The fruit has a texture like the soursop which some may describe as stringy or fibrous.

References

External links
Annona purpurea at University of Connecticut, Ecology & Evolutionary Biology
Soncoya at Trade Winds Fruit
Soncoya at Fruitsinfo.com
 information regarding possible use in medical treatments. 

purpurea
Trees of the Amazon
Tropical fruit
Crops originating from South America
Crops originating from Mexico
Trees of Mexico
Trees of Belize
Trees of Costa Rica
Trees of El Salvador
Trees of Guatemala
Trees of Honduras
Trees of Nicaragua
Trees of Panama
Trees of Venezuela
Taxa named by Martín Sessé y Lacasta
Taxa named by José Mariano Mociño
Taxa named by Michel Félix Dunal